iPoker is an online poker network owned by Playtech. In 2014, it was ranked as the 10th largest online poker network in the world.

References

External links
Official site

Online poker companies